The pharmacology of bicalutamide, a nonsteroidal antiandrogen (NSAA), has been well-characterized. In terms of pharmacodynamics, bicalutamide acts as a selective antagonist of the androgen receptor (AR), the biological target of androgens like testosterone and dihydrotestosterone (DHT). It does not decrease androgen levels and has no other important hormonal activity. The medication has progonadotropic effects due to its  antagonist activity and can increase androgen, estrogen, and neurosteroid production and levels. This results in a variety of differences of bicalutamide monotherapy compared to surgical and medical castration, such as indirect estrogenic effects and associated benefits like preservation of sexual function and drawbacks like gynecomastia. Bicalutamide can paradoxically stimulate late-stage prostate cancer due to accumulated mutations in the cancer. When used as a monotherapy, bicalutamide can induce breast development in males due to its estrogenic effects. Unlike other kinds of antiandrogens, it may have less adverse effect on the testes and fertility.

In terms of pharmacokinetics, bicalutamide is well-absorbed when taken by mouth. However, absorption diminishes at higher dosages. It reaches maximal constant levels after 4 to 12 weeks of therapy. Bicalutamide shows extensive plasma protein binding, mainly to albumin. It crosses the blood–brain barrier and exerts effects in the central nervous system. Bicalutamide is metabolized in the liver by hydroxylation and glucuronidation. The metabolites of bicalutamide are not known to be active. The medication has a very long biological half-life of 6 days with a single dose and 7 to 10 days with repeated administration. Bicalutamide and its metabolites are eliminated in urine, feces, and bile, mainly in the form of conjugates. The pharmacokinetics of bicalutamide are not influenced by food, age, body weight, renal impairment, or mild-to-moderate hepatic impairment, but ethnicity may influence its pharmacokinetics in some cases.

Pharmacodynamics

Antiandrogenic activity

Bicalutamide acts as a highly selective competitive silent antagonist of the androgen receptor (AR) ( = 159–243 nM), the major biological target of the androgen sex hormones testosterone and dihydrotestosterone (DHT). It has no capacity to activate the  under normal physiological circumstances. Levels of the (R)-isomer also notably are 100-fold higher than those of the (S)-isomer at steady-state.

Hence, bicalutamide may have some antiprogestogenic activity, although the clinical relevance of this is unknown. Bicalutamide does not inhibit 5α-reductase and is not known to inhibit other enzymes involved in androgen steroidogenesis (e.g., CYP17A1).

This protein appears to be involved in prostate cancer and breast cancer. Bicalutamide failed to affect testosterone signaling mediated by GPRC6A, another , on the other hand.

Drug levels, androgen levels, and efficacy
At steady-state, relative to the normal adult male range for testosterone levels (300–1,000 ng/dL), circulating concentrations of bicalutamide at 50 mg/day are roughly 600 to 2,500 times higher and at 150 mg/day around 1,500 to 8,000 times higher than circulating testosterone levels, while bicalutamide concentrations, relative to the mean testosterone levels present in men who have been surgically castrated (15 ng/dL), are approximately 42,000 times higher than testosterone levels at 50 mg/day.

Whereas testosterone is the major circulating androgen,  is the major androgen in the prostate gland.  levels in circulation are relatively low and only approximately 10% of those of circulating testosterone levels. Relative to testosterone,  is 2.5- to 10-fold as potent as an  agonist in bioassays, and hence, is a much stronger androgen in comparison. Bicalutamide monotherapy has been found to decrease circulating levels of prostate-specific antigen (PSA), a marker of prostate cancer growth, by 57% at 10 mg/day, 73% at 30 mg/day, 90% at 50 mg/day, 97% at 100 mg/day, and 97% at 150 mg/day, while a 97% reduction in PSA is observed with 50 mg/day bicalutamide as a part of CAB. It has also been reported that bicalutamide monotherapy decreases median circulating levels of PSA at 3 months by 86.7% at 100 mg/day, 91.1% at 150 mg/day, and 93.8% at 200 mg/day. Above a bicalutamide monotherapy dosage of 200 mg/day, up to 600 mg/day, decreases in PSA levels reach a plateau.

This is in accordance with clinical findings that  decreases with  using bicalutamide plateau at a dosage of bicalutamide of 150 to 200 mg/day.

In women, total testosterone levels are 20-fold and free testosterone levels 40-fold lower relative to men. In addition, whereas bicalutamide monotherapy can increase testosterone levels by up to 2-fold in men, the medication does not increase testosterone levels in women. For these reasons, much lower dosages of bicalutamide (e.g., 25 mg/day in the hirsutism studies) may be used in women with significant antiandrogenic effectiveness.

Influences on hormone levels

Follicle-stimulating hormone (FSH) levels, in contrast, remain essentially unchanged. The increase in  levels leads to an elevation in androgen and estrogen levels. At a dosage of 150 mg/day, bicalutamide has been found to increase testosterone levels by about 1.5- to 2-fold (59–97% increase) and estradiol levels by about 1.5- to 2.5-fold (65–146% increase). The estradiol concentrations produced in men by bicalutamide monotherapy are said to approximate the low-normal estradiol levels of a premenopausal woman, while testosterone levels generally remain in the high end of the normal male range and rarely exceed it. Dosages of bicalutamide of 10 mg, 30 mg, and 50 mg per day have been found to produce a "moderate" effect on sex hormone levels in men with prostate cancer (notably providing indication that the drug has clinically-relevant antiandrogen effects in males at a dosage as low as 10 mg/day). The elevated levels of gonadotropins and gonadal steroids associated with  monotherapy is a unique endocrine state which can be described as "hypergonadotropic hypergonadism".

Bicalutamide increases androgen and estrogen levels only in men, and does not do so in women. This is because androgen levels are comparatively far lower in women and in turn exert little to no basal suppression of the  axis. Minimal or no changes of importance in levels of total testosterone, free testosterone, dihydrotestosterone, estradiol, androstenedione (A4), dehydroepiandrosterone (DHEA), dehydroepiandrosterone sulfate (DHEA-S), 3α-androstanediol glucuronide (3α-ADG), progesterone, 17α-hydroxyprogesterone (17α-OHP), prolactin, or  have been observed in women with hirsutism with or without polycystic ovary syndrome that were treated with 25 or 50 mg/day bicalutamide for 6 to 12 months. In addition to the minimal changes in hormone levels in women, although bicalutamide monotherapy increases gonadotropin and sex hormone levels in men, this will not occur if bicalutamide is combined with an antigonadotropin such as a  analogue, estrogen, or progestogen, as these medications maintain negative feedback on the HPG axis.

In fact, estradiol is a much stronger inhibitor of gonadotropin secretion than is testosterone, and even though circulating concentrations of estradiol are far lower than those of testosterone in men, it is said that estradiol is nonetheless likely the major feedback regulator of gonadotropin secretion in this sex. In addition to systemic or circulating estradiol, local aromatization of testosterone into estradiol in the hypothalamus and pituitary gland may contribute to suppression of gonadotropin secretion.

Bicalutamide more than blocks the effects of the increased testosterone levels that it induces in men, which is evidenced by its dose-dependent antiandrogenic effects and by the fact that monotherapy with the drug is about as effective as  analogue therapy in the treatment of prostate cancer. However, in contrast, the effects of the elevated estrogen levels remain unopposed by bicalutamide, and this is largely responsible for the feminizing side effects (e.g., gynecomastia) of the drug in men.

Testosterone levels decline with age in men and younger men have higher testosterone levels on average than older men. Men with prostate cancer treated with bicalutamide are relatively elderly. The increases in testosterone levels with  like flutamide and bicalutamide may result in greater absolute levels of testosterone and estradiol in younger men than in older men. In one study that administered flutamide, free testosterone levels in young men increased from about 26pg/mL at baseline to about 34pg/mL with flutamide (+31%) and in elderly men from about 16pg/mL at baseline to about 21pg/mL (+31%) with flutamide. Hence, free testosterone levels with flutamide were approximately 1.6-fold higher in young men than in elderly men in this study. In the case of estradiol, total estradiol levels in young men increased from about 26pg/mL at baseline to about 45pg/mL with flutamide (+73%) and in elderly men changed from about 31pg/mL to about 30pg/mL (–3%). For instance, one study administering flutamide to late-pubertal males found that total testosterone levels increased from 729ng/dL at baseline to 991ng/dL with flutamide (+34%).

Differences from castration
In the case of sexual interest and function, this notion is supported by a variety of findings including animal studies showing that estrogen deficiency results in diminished sexual behavior, treatment with tamoxifen resulting in significantly lowered libido in 30% of men receiving it for male breast cancer, and estrogen administration restoring libido and the frequency of sexual intercourse in men with congenital estrogen deficiency, among others.

Due to the fact that bicalutamide does not lower testosterone levels, the levels of these metabolites would not be expected to be lowered either, unlike with therapies such as  analogues. (Indeed, testosterone, and estradiol levels are actually raised by bicalutamide treatment, and for this reason, levels of 3α- and 3β-androstanediol might be elevated to some degree similarly.) These metabolites of testosterone have been found to have -independent positive effects on sexual motivation, and may be involved in the preservation of sexual interest and function by bicalutamide and other . However, a study found that a combination of bicalutamide and dutasteride, a 5α-reductase inhibitor and inhibitor of neurosteroid biosynthesis, produced fewer sexual side effects than  analogue therapy, specifically suggesting the role of estradiol in the preservation sexual interest and function with bicalutamide monotherapy rather than of DHT metabolites.

As an alternative possibility to testosterone metabolites preserving sexual desire and function with bicalutamide, it has been suggested that bicalutamide may not be able to block the actions of androgens in the brain to a degree sufficient to cause substantial sexual impairment.

It has been reported that bicalutamide, surprisingly, has no antianabolic effect on testosterone propionate-induced increases in levator ani muscle weight at doses that inhibit and even completely prevent testosterone propionate-induced growth of the prostate gland and seminal vesicles in rats. As such, it has been said that, based on preclinical research, bicalutamide does not have marked antianabolic effects. However, higher doses of bicalutamide are able to considerably inhibit the growth of the levator ani muscle in rats. In any case, analogously to animal findings, bicalutamide monotherapy has been found to significantly preserve lean muscle mass and muscle strength in aged men with prostate cancer relative to GnRH agonists. It is notable that in contrast to castration, bicalutamide preserves and increases estrogen levels, and estrogens are thought to have positive effects on skeletal muscle, including on muscle mass.

Paradoxical stimulation of late-stage prostate cancer
As both of these circumstances can eventually occur in prostate cancer, resistance to bicalutamide usually develops and the drug has the potential to paradoxically stimulate tumor growth when this happens. This is the mechanism of the phenomenon of antiandrogen withdrawal syndrome, where antiandrogen discontinuation paradoxically slows the rate of tumor growth.

Induction of breast development

In transgender women, breast development is a desired effect of antiandrogen and/or estrogen treatment. Bicalutamide induces breast development in individuals assigned male at birth by two mechanisms: 1) blocking androgen signaling in breast tissue; and 2) increasing estrogen levels. Estrogen is responsible for the induction of breast development under normal circumstances, while androgens powerfully suppress estrogen-induced breast growth. It has been found that very low levels of estrogen can induce breast development in the presence of low or no androgen signaling. In accordance, not only does bicalutamide induce gynecomastia at a high rate when given as a monotherapy to men with prostate cancer (47–85%; 66% in one very large trial), similarly to high-dose estrogen therapy with diethylstilbestrol (41–77%),  have been found to result in a higher incidence of gynecomastia in combination with a  analogue (13–25%) relative to  analogue therapy or castration alone (1–16%) (in spite of the presence of only castrate levels of estrogen in both cases).

In addition, it was observed that the lobuloalveolar maturation reversed upon discontinuation of  after sex reassignment surgery in these individuals. It was concluded that progestogen in addition to antiandrogen/estrogen treatment is required for the induction of full female histological breast development (i.e., that includes complete lobuloalveolar maturation), and that continued progestogen treatment is necessary to maintain such maturation. It should be noted however that although these findings may have important implications in the contexts of lactation and breastfeeding, epithelial tissue accounts for approximately only 10% of breast volume (with the bulk of the breasts (80–90%) being represented by stromal or adipose tissue), and it is uncertain to what extent, if any, that development of lobuloalveolar structures (a form of epithelial tissue) contributes to breast size and/or shape.

Effects on spermatogenesis and fertility
In accordance with the fact that the testes are the source of 95% of circulating testosterone in the body, local levels of testosterone inside of the testes are extremely high, ranging from 20- to 200-fold higher than circulating concentrations. Moreover, high levels of testosterone within the testes are required for spermatogenesis, although only a small fraction (5–10%) of normal levels appears to actually be necessary for spermatogenesis.

Unlike with antigonadotropic antiandrogens like  and  analogues, it has been reported that bicalutamide monotherapy (at 50 mg/day) has very little or no effect on the ultrastructure of the testes and on spermatogenesis in men even after long-term therapy (>4 years). This may be explained by the extremely high local levels of testosterone in the testes, in that it is likely that systemic bicalutamide therapy is unable to achieve concentrations of the drug within the testes that are able to considerably block androgen signaling in this part of the body. This is particularly so considering that bicalutamide increases circulating testosterone levels, and by extension gonadal testosterone production, by up to two-fold in males, and that only a small fraction of normal intratesticular testosterone levels, and by extension androgen action, appears to be necessary to maintain spermatogenesis. Bicalutamide monotherapy at 50 mg/day causes no or clinically unimportant Leydig cell hyperplasia.

As such, bicalutamide and other  may uniquely have the potential to preserve testicular function and spermatogenesis and thus male fertility relative to alternative therapies. In accordance with this notion, a study found that prolonged, high-dose bicalutamide treatment had minimal effects on fertility in male rats. However, another study found that low-dose bicalutamide administration resulted in testicular atrophy and reduced the germ cell count in the testes of male rats by almost 50%, though the rate of successful fertilization and pregnancy following mating was not assessed. Additional studies found that bicalutamide decreased testes weights, altered testes histology, and decreased sperm count in male rats. Yet another study found that bicalutamide has no effect on testes weights or spermatogenesis in male rats.

In contrast, pure  antagonists would, in theory, result in the opposite (although reduced semen volume and sexual dysfunction may occur):

However, while bicalutamide does not appear to adversely influence testicular spermatogenesis, and healthy sperm can be produced within the testes during bicalutamide monotherapy,  antagonists may be able to interfere with male fertility via interference with androgen signaling beyond the testes. The maturation as well as transport of sperm occurs not only in the testes but also outside of the testes in the epididymides and vas deferens, and these processes in these tissues are dependent on  signaling similarly to testicular spermatogenesis. However, whereas androgen levels are extremely high in the testes, this is not true in the epididymides and vas deferens. As androgen levels are relatively low in these tissues, at least compared to the testes, bicalutamide may be able to block  signaling in these parts of the body to an extent that is sufficient to interfere with male fertility. However, this use of mesterolone is controversial and its efficacy for such purposes is not fully certain.

Although bicalutamide alone would appear to have minimal detrimental effect on testicular spermatogenesis and hence on certain aspects of male fertility, other hormonal agents that bicalutamide may be combined with, including  analogues and particularly estrogens (as in transgender hormone therapy), can have a considerable detrimental effect on fertility. This is largely a consequence of their antigonadotropic activity. Antigonadotropic agents like high-dose , high-dose androgens (e.g., testosterone esters), and  antagonists (though notably not  agonists in the case of fertility) produce hypogonadism and high rates of severe or complete infertility (e.g., severe oligospermia or complete azoospermia) in men. However, these effects are fully and often rapidly reversible with their discontinuation, even after prolonged treatment. In contrast, while estrogens at sufficiently high dosages similarly are able to produce hypogonadism and to abolish or severely impair spermatogenesis, this is not necessarily reversible in the case of estrogens and can be long-lasting after prolonged exposure. The difference is attributed to an apparently unique, direct cytotoxic and adverse effect of high concentrations of estrogens on the Leydig cells of the testes.

Other activities

Cytochrome P450 modulation
It has been reported that bicalutamide may have the potential to inhibit the enzymes CYP3A4 and, to a lesser extent, CYP2C9, CYP2C19, and CYP2D6, based on in vitro research. However, no relevant inhibition of CYP3A4 has been observed in vivo with bicalutamide at a dose of 150 mg (using midazolam as a specific marker of CYP3A4 activity). In animals, bicalutamide has been found to be an inducer of certain cytochrome P450 enzymes. However, dosages of 150 mg/day or less have shown no evidence of this in humans.

Bicalutamide has been identified as a strong CYP27A1 (cholesterol 27-hydroxylase) inhibitor in vitro. In addition to CYP27A1, bicalutamide has been found to bind to and inhibit CYP46A1 (cholesterol 24-hydroxylase) in vitro, but this has yet to be assessed and confirmed in vivo.

P-Glycoprotein inhibition
Bicalutamide, as well as enzalutamide, have been found to act as inhibitors of P-glycoprotein efflux and ATPase activity. This action may reverse docetaxel resistance in prostate cancer cells by reducing transport of the drug out of these cells.

GABAA receptor positive modulation
All of the  approved for the treatment of prostate cancer have been found to possess an off-target action of acting as weak non-competitive inhibitors of human GABAA receptor currents in vitro to varying extents. The  values are 44 μM for flutamide (as hydroxyflutamide), 21 μM for nilutamide, 5.2 μM for bicalutamide, and 3.6 μM for enzalutamide. In addition, flutamide, nilutamide, and enzalutamide have been found to cause convulsions and/or death in mice at sufficiently high doses. Bicalutamide was notably not found to do this, but this was likely simply due to the limited central nervous system penetration of bicalutamide in this species. In any case, enzalutamide is the only approved  that has been found to be associated with a significantly increased incidence of seizures and other associated side effects clinically, so the relevance of the aforementioned findings with regard to bicalutamide and the other  is unclear.

Miscellaneous
Bicalutamide has been identified as a potent antagonist of the protease-activated receptor 2 (PAR-2) and as a ligand and inhibitor of α2-macroglobulin.

Pharmacokinetics

The pharmacokinetics of bicalutamide are unaffected by food, age, body weight, renal impairment, and mild-to-moderate hepatic impairment. However, it has been observed that steady-state concentrations of bicalutamide are higher in Japanese individuals than in Caucasians, indicating that ethnicity may be associated with differences in the pharmacokinetics of bicalutamide in some instances.

Absorption
Bicalutamide is extensively and well-absorbed following oral administration, and its absorption is not affected by food. The absolute bioavailability of bicalutamide in humans is unknown due to its very low water solubility and hence lack of an assessable intravenous formulation. However, the absolute bioavailability of bicalutamide has been found to be high in animals at low doses (109% in mice at 10 mg/kg; 72% in rats at 1 mg/kg; 100% in dogs at 0.1 mg/kg), but diminishes with increasing doses such that the bioavailability of bicalutamide is low at high doses (10% in rats at 250 mg/kg; 31% in dogs at 100 mg/kg). In accordance, absorption of (R)-bicalutamide in humans is slow and extensive but saturable, with steady-state levels increasing linearly at a dosage of up to 150 mg/day and non-linearly at higher dosages.

At higher dosages of 100 to 200 mg/day, absorption of bicalutamide is approximately linear, with a small but increasing departure from linearity above 150 mg/day. In terms of geometric mean steady-state concentrations of (R)-bicalutamide, the departures from linearity were 4%, 13%, 17%, and 32% with dosages of 100, 150, 200, and 300 mg/day, respectively. There is a plateau in steady-state levels of (R)-bicalutamide with bicalutamide dosages above 300 mg/day, and, accordingly, dosages of bicalutamide of 300 to 600 mg/day result in similar circulating concentrations of (R)-bicalutamide and similar degrees clinically of efficacy, tolerability, and toxicity. Relative to 150 mg/day bicalutamide, levels of (R)-bicalutamide are about 15% higher at a dosage of 200 mg/day and about 50% higher at a dosage of 300 mg/day. In contrast to (R)-bicalutamide, the inactive enantiomer (S)-bicalutamide is much more rapidly absorbed (as well as cleared from circulation).

Steady-state concentrations of the drug are reached after 4 to 12 weeks of administration independently of dosage, with an approximate 10- to 20-fold progressive accumulation of circulating levels of (R)-bicalutamide. The relatively long time to reach steady-state is a product of the long elimination half-life of bicalutamide. With single 50 mg and 150 mg doses of bicalutamide, mean peak concentrations (Cmax) of (R)-bicalutamide are 0.77 μg/mL (1.8 μmol/L) (at 31 hours) and 1.4 μg/mL (3.3 μmol/L) (at 39 hours), respectively. At steady-state, mean circulating concentrations (Css) of (R)-bicalutamide with 50 mg/day and 150 mg/day bicalutamide are 8.85 μg/mL (20.6 μmol/L) and 21.6 μg/mL (50.2 μmol/L), respectively. In another 150 mg/day bicalutamide study, mean circulating concentrations of (R)-bicalutamide were 19.4 μg/mL (45.1 μmol/L) and 28.5 μg/mL (66.3 μmol/L) on days 28 and 84 (weeks 4 and 12) of treatment, respectively.

Distribution
The apparent oral volume of distribution (VSS/F) at steady state of (R)-bicalutamide with oral administration of a single 5 to 80 mg dose of (R)-bicalutamide in a novel solid dispersion with a polymeric matrix of hydroxypropyl methylcellulose phthalate (HP55S) (also known as (R)-bicalutamide/HP55S) ranges from 22.53 ± 3.71 L to 25.38 ± 2.69 L. Bicalutamide is highly protein-bound (96.1% for racemic bicalutamide, 99.6% for (R)-bicalutamide), mainly to albumin.

The tissue distribution of bicalutamide is not well-characterized. However, it has been reported that distribution studies with bicalutamide have shown that preferential (i.e., tissue-selective) accumulation in anabolic (e.g., muscle) tissues does not occur. There are no available data on hepatic bicalutamide concentrations in humans, but a rat study found that oral bicalutamide treatment resulted in 4-fold higher concentrations of the drug in the liver relative to plasma (a common finding with orally administered drugs, due to transfer through the hepatic portal system prior to reaching circulation). In men receiving 150 mg/day bicalutamide, concentrations of (R)-bicalutamide in semen were 4.9 μg/mL (11 μmol/L), and the amount of the drug that could potentially be delivered to a female partner during sexual intercourse is regarded as low (estimated at 0.3 μg/kg) and below the amount that is required to induce changes in the offspring of laboratory animals.

Based on animal research, it was initially thought that bicalutamide was unable to cross the blood–brain barrier into the central nervous system and hence would be a peripherally-selective antiandrogen in humans. This conclusion was drawn from the finding that bicalutamide does not increase  or testosterone levels in multiple tested animal species (including rats and dogs).  antagonists like flutamide normally do this by blocking  in the pituitary gland and hypothalamus in the brain and thereby disinhibiting the  axis. In humans however, bicalutamide has been found to increase  and testosterone levels, and to a comparable extent relative to flutamide and nilutamide. This occurs to a significant extent at even a very low dosage of 10 mg/day bicalutamide. As such, it appears that there are species differences in the central penetration of bicalutamide and that the medication does indeed cross the blood–brain barrier and affect central function in humans. This is supported by potential side effects of bicalutamide, in spite of increased testosterone levels, like hot flashes and decreased sexual interest in men. However, a clinical study comparing bicalutamide and flutamide in men found that bicalutamide had less influence on the  axis than flutamide, suggesting that bicalutamide might have a limited degree of peripheral selectivity, at least compared to other , in humans.

Bicalutamide has been identified as a substrate of P-glycoprotein and of the breast cancer resistance protein (BCRP), though not of the multidrug resistance-associated protein 1 (MRP1). This may be involved in tumor resistance to bicalutamide. P-Glycoprotein is also known to play a major role in excluding drugs from the brain due to efflux back across the blood–brain barrier.

Metabolism
The metabolism of bicalutamide is hepatic and stereoselective. The inactive (S)-enantiomer is metabolized mainly by glucuronidation and is rapidly cleared from circulation, while the active (R)-isomer is slowly hydroxylated and then glucuronidated. In accordance, the active (R)-enantiomer has a far longer elimination half-life than the (S)-isomer, and circulating levels of (R)-bicalutamide are 10- to 20-fold and 100-fold higher than those of (S)-bicalutamide after a single dose and at steady-state, respectively. (R)-Bicalutamide is almost exclusively metabolized via hydroxylation into (R)-hydroxybicalutamide by the cytochrome P450 enzyme CYP3A4. Bicalutamide is also glucuronidated by UGT1A9, a UDP-glucuronyltransferase, into bicalutamide glucuronide, and (R)-hydroxybicalutamide glucuronide is formed from the metabolism of (R)-hydroxybicalutamide by UGT1A9. Similar to the inactive (S)-enantiomer of bicalutamide, (R)-hydroxybicalutamide is glucuronidated and rapidly cleared from circulation. None of the metabolites of bicalutamide are known to be active. Following administration of bicalutamide, only low concentrations of the metabolites are detectable in blood plasma, while unchanged bicalutamide predominates. (R)-Bicalutamide has a long elimination half-life of 5.8 days with a single dose, and an elimination half-life of 7 to 10 days with repeated administration, which allows for convenient once-daily dosing of bicalutamide.

Elimination
Bicalutamide is eliminated in feces (43%) and urine (34%), whereas its metabolites are eliminated in approximately equal proportions in urine and bile. It is excreted to a substantial extent in its unmetabolized form, with both bicalutamide and its metabolites excreted mainly as glucuronide conjugates.

Graphs

References

Bicalutamide
Medication pharmacology